The Market of San Miguel (Spanish: Mercado de San Miguel) is a covered market located in Madrid, Spain. Originally built in 1916, it was purchased by private investors in 2003 who renovated the iron structure and reopened it in 2009.

Overview
San Miguel Market is the most popular market in Madrid among tourists since it is located in the centre of Madrid, within walking distance from Plaza Mayor. The market is not a traditional grocery market but a gourmet tapas market, with over 30 different vendors selling a wide variety of freshly prepared tapas, hams, olives, baked goods and other foods. Beer, wine and champagne are also available.

Gallery

See also
 Mercado de Campo de Ourique, Lisbon

References

External links
 

1916 establishments in Spain
Buildings and structures completed in 1916
Retail markets in Spain
Buildings and structures in Palacio neighborhood, Madrid
Tourist attractions in Madrid
Bien de Interés Cultural landmarks in Madrid
Iron and steel buildings
Food markets